Sayyid Sir Hamoud bin Mohammed Al-Said, GCSI (1853 – 18 July 1902) (ruled 27 August 1896 - 18 July 1902), was the British-controlled Omani sultan of the protectorate of Zanzibar, who outlawed slavery on the island.

Biography
Hamoud became sultan with the support of the British consul, Sir Basil Cave, upon the death of Sayyid Hamad bin Thuwaini. Before he could enter the palace, another potential contender for the throne, Sayyid Khalid bin Barghash, seized the palace and declared himself sultan. The British responded the next day, 26 August 1896, by issuing an ultimatum to Khalid and his entourage to evacuate the palace by 9:00 am on 27 August. When he refused, Royal Navy warships fired on the palace and other strategic locations in the city, causing Khalid and his group to flee. According to the Guinness Book of World Records, the resultant Anglo-Zanzibar War was the shortest war in history, and the same day Hamoud was able to assume the title of sultan, more indebted to the British than ever.

Hamoud demanded that slavery be abolished in Zanzibar and that all the slaves be manumitted.

On his death in 1902, he was succeeded by his oldest son, Sayyid Ali bin Hamud.

Legacy
By his wife, Sayyida Khanfora bint Majid Al-Busaid (daughter of the first Sultan of Zanzibar), he had ten children:

Sayyid Ali bin Hamud Al-Busaid, 8th Sultan of Zanzibar
Sayyid Majid bin Hamud Al-Busaid
Sayyid Saud bin Hamud Al-Busaid
Sayyid Taimur bin Hamud Al-Busaid
Sayyid Faisal bin Hamud Al-Busaid
Sayyid Muhammed bin Hamud Al-Busaid
Sayyida Matuka bint Hamud Al-Busaid (who married Sayyid Khalifa bin Harub Al-Busaid, 9th Sultan of Zanzibar)
Sayyida Boran bint Hamud Al-Busaid (who married Sayyid Said bin Ali, the son of the fourth Sultan of Zanzibar)
Sayyida Mishan bint Hamud Al-Busaid (twin with Boran)
Sayyida Hakima bint Hamud Al-Busaid

Honours
Knight Grand Commander of the Order of the Star of India (GCSI) – 1894

Al Said dynasty
1853 births
1902 deaths
Hamud bin Muhammed
Honorary Knights Grand Commander of the Order of the Star of India
Zanzibari royalty
19th-century Arabs
19th-century Omani people